Sir Frederick William Chance (26 December 1852 – 31 August 1932) was a British Liberal Party politician from Carlisle. He sat in the House of Commons from 1905 to 1910.

Background
Chance was from a long-established family of businessmen and politicians in Carlisle. He ran the family's cotton-manufacturing firm in the town, Ferguson Brothers, and served as Mayor of Carlisle in 1904, before becoming a member of Cumberland County Council. Both his grandfather Joseph Ferguson and his uncle Robert Ferguson had been Members of Parliament (MPs) for the borough of Carlisle and he was a brother-in-law of Sir Henry Seton-Karr, the MP for St Helens.

Carlisle's MP since 1886 was William Court Gully, who served as Speaker of the House of Commons from 1895 to 1905. Ill-health forced Gully to resign as Speaker in May 1905, and at the by-election in July 1905 Chance was elected as the Member of Parliament (MP) for Carlisle. He was re-elected unopposed in 1906, and held the seat until the January 1910 general election, when he did not stand again.

He was High Sheriff of Cumberland in 1915.

References

External links 
 

1852 births
1932 deaths
Liberal Party (UK) MPs for English constituencies
UK MPs 1900–1906
UK MPs 1906–1910
Mayors of Carlisle, Cumbria
Members of Cumberland County Council
English businesspeople
British textile industry businesspeople
High Sheriffs of Cumberland